The Los Angeles Kings are an American professional ice hockey team based in Los Angeles, California. They play in the Pacific Division of the Western Conference in the National Hockey League (NHL). The team joined the NHL in 1967 as an expansion team with five other teams, and won their first Stanley Cup in 2012. Having first played at The Forum, the Kings have played their home games at the Staples Center since 1999. The team has had nine general managers since their inception.

Key

General managers

See also
List of NHL general managers

Notes
 A running total of the number of general managers of the franchise. Thus any general manager who has two or more separate terms as general manager is only counted once.

References

Los Angeles Kings
 
Los Angeles Kings general managers
Gen